Royal Consort Gwi-in of the Miryang Park clan (귀인 밀양박씨; 1827 – 9 May 1889) was a concubine of King Cheoljong of Joseon.

Biography
The future Lady Gwi-in was born in 1827, during the 27th year of King Sunjo's reign, into the Miryang Park clan. She entered the palace as a gungnyeo and became a Royal Consort after giving birth to a prince, on August 3, 1854. Her son died later that year.

Park Gwi-in died on May 9, 1889 (the 26th year of King Gojong's reign), at the age of 63 years old.

Her tomb was initially located in Pocheon, Gyeonggi Province, but was later moved to the Seosamneung Cluster, in Goyang, which also contains Yereung, her husband's tomb.

In popular culture
 Portrayed by Park Ji-young in the 1990 MBC TV series Daewongun.

References

1827 births
1889 deaths
Royal consorts of the Joseon dynasty